José Antonio Pujante Diekmann (10 December 1964 – 1 January 2019) was a Spanish politician and philosophy professor. Pujante, a regional coordinator for the United Left–Greens of the Region of Murcia, served as a deputy of the Regional Assembly of Murcia from 2007 until his death in office in 2019. 

Pujante died of a heart attack on the morning of 1 January 2019 in Murcia, at the age of 54.

References

1964 births
2019 deaths
Members of the Regional Assembly of Murcia
United Left (Spain) politicians
University of Murcia alumni
People from Lorca, Spain